Under normal circumstances, visitors to Kuwait must obtain a visa unless they come from one of the visa exempt countries or countries eligible for visa on arrival/eVisa. All visitors (except Gulf Cooperation Council citizens) must hold a passport valid for 6 months.

Visa policy map

Visa exemption 
Citizens of the following countries do not require a visa to visit Kuwait and may use national ID Cards to enter the country:

As of February 2020 and until further notice, this policy has been amended so that the national ID cards are no longer valid to enter Kuwait as a prevention of the coronavirus.

Nationals of China holding normal passports endorsed for public affairs do not require a visa.

Holders of diplomatic or official passports of Albania, Algeria, Azerbaijan, Bangladesh, Bulgaria, Cyprus, China, Egypt, Germany, Honduras, Hungary, India, Ireland, Malta, Mongolia, Morocco, Pakistan, Peru, Philippines, Portugal, Romania, Russia, Serbia, South Korea, Switzerland, Tajikistan, Turkey, Ukraine, United Kingdom and Vietnam and just diplomatic passports of Armenia, Estonia, France, Greece, Italy, Iraq, Mexico, Poland, Spain and Uzbekistan also do not require a visa. An agreement with Djibouti was signed in July 2019 and it is yet to be ratified.

Visa on arrival/eVisa
Citizens of the following 53 countries and territories may obtain a visa valid for 3 months on arrival to Kuwait if arriving by air or they may obtain an eVisa before arrival:

A visa can also be obtained on arrival valid for one month for those holding a confirmation from a transporting carrier and are travelling for tourism purposes.

Passengers arriving by sea or land must obtain visa in advance.

Residents of GCC countries belonging to designated professions may also obtain a visa online.

Israel
Israeli nationals are banned from entering and transiting in Kuwait.

Regulations
In recent decades, Kuwait has enacted certain measures to regulate the issuance of new visas for foreign labor. For instance, workers from Georgia and Morocco are subject to heightened scrutiny when applying for entry visas, and an outright ban was imposed on the entry of domestic workers from Guinea-Bissau and Vietnam. Workers from Bangladesh and Pakistan are also scrutinized when applying for new visas. In April 2019, Kuwait added Ethiopia, Burkina Faso, Bhutan, Guinea and Guinea-Bissau to the list of restricted countries. According to Migrant Rights, the visa restrictions are put in place mainly due to the fact that these countries lack embassies and labour corporations in Kuwait. A visa restriction on nationals of Ethiopia was lifted in 2018.

After President of the United States Donald Trump's Executive Order 13769, which banned the entry of nationals from Afghanistan, Sudan, Pakistan, Iraq, Somalia, Libya, Syria, and Yemen into the United States, several Western news sites published stories claiming a similar visa ban in Kuwait. The Kuwaiti Ministry of Foreign Affairs denied that they currently ban nationals from those countries from entering Kuwait.

From 31 January 2020, Kuwait has temporarily banned the admission to all China ordinary passport holders, including Hong Kong SAR passport holders, because of the severe spreading of SARS-CoV-2 in China. Citizens of other countries who have entered China and Hong Kong in the last 2 weeks are also refused entry.

See also

Visa requirements for Kuwaiti citizens

References

External links 
List of countries whose citizens can obtain Visas upon arrival at all Kuwaiti ports of entry, Embassy of the State of Kuwait - Washington, DC
Visa Requirements for GCC Residents
Kuwait Visa Status Check Online

Kuwait
Law of Kuwait